Bangkok (Hua Lamphong) railway station is a railway station in Pathum Wan, the former central passenger terminal in Bangkok and the former railway hub of Thailand. It is in the center of the city in the Pathum Wan district, and is operated by the State Railway of Thailand (SRT). It is not to be confused with Krung Thep Aphiwat Central Terminal, which is the current central station.

Naming
The station is officially referred to by the State Railway of Thailand as Bangkok railway station or Sathani Rotfai Krung Thep (สถานีรถไฟกรุงเทพ) in Thai. Hua Lamphong was originally the informal name of the station, used by locals, tourist guides and the public press. In outlying areas of Thailand the station is commonly referred to as Krungthep Station, and the name Hua Lamphong is not well-known. In all documents published by the State Railway of Thailand (such as train tickets, timetables, and tour pamphlets) the station is uniformly transcribed as Krungthep (กรุงเทพ) in Thai. As of 19 January 2023, following the opening of Krung Thep Aphiwat Central Terminal, the station was officially renamed Bangkok (Hua Lamphong) railway station.

The name Hua Lamphong is the name of both a canal and a road (now Rama IV Road) that used to pass near this station. The name Hua Lamphong, some say originated from the green plains surrounding the area in the past that were used to graze the cattle of the Muslim community, when the people saw the cattle running vigorously in the plains, it was named the Thung Wua Lamphong ('swaggering bulls plains'), eventually being called Hua Lamphong. Others presumed that the name originated from a species of plant called Lamphong (Datura metel), a toxic plant that used to grow abundantly in the area.

It is also thought that the name may have a Malay origin as a mixture  of khua in Thai, meaning 'bridge', and the word lampung in Malay (pronounced lumpung) meaning 'to float'. Loi Khua Lumphung, thus meaning a temporary bridge (across or floating on the river) then become known as Hua Lamphong by Thais.

Hua Lamphong railway station actually was a name of another railway station of private Paknam Railway Line which operated before the founding of the Royal Siamese Railway Department (now the State Railway of Thailand). Hua Lamphong railway station was opposite the present day Bangkok railway station. It opened in 1893 and closed in 1960 in conjunction with the dissolution of the Paknam Railway Line. The site of the demolished Hua Lamphong railway station borders Rama IV Road. Today, the Bangkok subway's Hua Lamphong MRT station lies beneath it.

History

The station was opened on 25 June 1916 after six years of construction that started in 1910 in the reign of King Chulalongkorn and finished in the reign of King Vajiravudh. The site of the railway station was previously occupied by the national railway's maintenance centre, which moved to Makkasan in June 1910. At the nearby site of the previous railway station a pillar commemorates the inauguration of the Thai railway network in 1897.

The station was built in an Italian Neo-Renaissance-style, with decorated wooden roofs and stained glass windows, with the Frankfurt (Main) Hauptbahnhof in Germany as a prototype. The front of the building was designed by Turin-born Mario Tamagno, who with countryman Annibale Rigotti (1870–1968) was also responsible for the design of several other early 20th century public buildings in Bangkok. The pair designed Bang Khun Phrom Palace (1906), Ananta Samakhom Throne Hall in the Royal Plaza (1907–1915) and Suan Kularb Residential Hall and Throne Hall in Dusit Garden, among other buildings.

Initially, Hua Lamphong was a combined railway station: it transported goods and people. Over time, the transport of freight and passengers proved untenable due to the limited area for expansion of the 120 rais (48 acres) site. The transport of goods was shifted to the Phahonyothin freight yard in 1960.

The station is an air-conditioned two-storey building consisting of two main entrances, 12 platforms, 22 ticket counters, and two electric display boards, with one mega television screen. Above two entrances to the platforms are the large pictures showing the beginning of the Thai railway history. In the booming railway travel era, a right part of the station building used to be 10-rooms for who wants to stay overnight in the form of transit hotel named  "Rajdhani Hotel" (โรงแรมราชธานี), it was in operation between 1927 and 1969. 

On 8 November 1986, 6 runaway, unmanned, coupled locomotives which had their engines left on due to maintenance works at Bang Sue Depot collided at Bangkok railway station, killing 4 and injuring 4.

Prior to 2020, Hua Lamphong served about 200 trains and approximately 60,000 passengers each day. Since 2004 the station has been connected by an underground passage to the MRT (Metropolitan Rapid Transit) subway system's Hua Lamphong MRT Station. The station is also a terminus of the Eastern and Oriental Express luxury trains, and the International Express to Malaysia.

On 25 June 2019, the 103rd anniversary of Hua Lamphong was celebrated with a Google Doodle.

Closure 

The station was scheduled to be closed as a railway station in 2021, when it would have been converted into a museum. The move to Bangkok's central station to Krung Thep Aphiwat Central Terminal was planned as soon as the SRT Dark Red Line services were opened but it was delayed due to opposition. 

Long distance trains were moved to terminate at Krung Thep Aphiwat on 19 January 2023. Currently only ordinary and commuter trains (calling at all stops) operate on the Northern, Northeastern and Southern lines, while all Eastern line services terminate here.

Gallery

See also 

 List of railway stations in Thailand
 Thon Buri railway station
 Krung Thep Aphiwat Central Terminal

References

Sources
 รายงานกองบัญชาการครั้งที่ 20 กล่าวด้วยการเดินรถไฟหลวงทางขนาดใหญ่ในกรุงสยามประจำพระพุทธศักราช 2459 (ปิคฤศต์ศักราช 1916-17), กรมรถไฟหลวง, โรงพิมพ์กรมรถไฟ, 2460 (Stored in National Archives of Thailand)
 งานฉลอง 50 ปี กรมรถไฟหลวง, กรมรถไฟหลวง, โรงพิมพ์กรมรถไฟ, 2490

Railway stations in Bangkok
Buildings and structures in Bangkok
Pathum Wan district
Railway stations opened in 1916
1916 establishments in Siam
Unregistered ancient monuments in Bangkok